Brian Murdoch may refer to:

 Brian H. Murdoch (1930–2020), Irish mathematician
 Brian O. Murdoch (born 1944), emeritus professor at the University of Stirling, Scotland